Suttukeni (Tamil: சுத்துக்கேணி) is a village near Katterikuppam (Tamil: காட்டேறிக்குப்பம்) in Puducherry, in southeastern India. It is the location of a megalithic site. It seems to have been active in trade with Arikamedu.  Jewellery from Suttukeny, dated to the 2nd century BCE, is on display at the Musée Guimet in Paris.

References

Villages in Puducherry district